Pathé Review: Monsters of the Past is a 1923 American short  silent documentary film, produced as part of the Pathé Review series, featuring sculptor Virginia May at work and stop-motion footage of her dinosaur creations fighting.

References

External links

American black-and-white films
American silent short films
1923 documentary films
Black-and-white documentary films
Films about dinosaurs
Documentary films about animation
1920s stop-motion animated films
American short documentary films
1920s short documentary films
1920s American films